Shōya, Shoya, Syoya or Shouya (written: , ,  or ) is a masculine Japanese given name. Notable people with the name include:

, Japanese voice actor
, Japanese footballer
, Japanese footballer
, Japanese motorcycle racer
, Japanese baseball player
Syoya Kimata (木全 翔也, born 2000), Japanese idol, member of JO1

Japanese masculine given names